Limnaecia eugramma is a moth of the family Cosmopterigidae. It is known from Australia.

References

Limnaecia
Moths described in 1899
Moths of Australia